Cham-e Divan (also Romanized as Cham-e Dīvān) is a village in Veysian Rural District, Veysian District, Dowreh County, Lorestan Province, Iran. At the 2006 census, its population was 884, in 192 families.

References 

Towns and villages in Dowreh County